Quittapahilla Creek (nicknamed the "Quittie") is a  tributary of Swatara Creek in south-central Pennsylvania in the United States. The original Lenape name for this waterway is Kuwektəpehəle, which means 'it flows out (ktəpehəle) from the pines (kuwe)'.

Quittapahilla Creek rises in eastern Lebanon County, flows west-southwest through Lebanon and Annville, and joins Swatara Creek northeast of Palmyra.

By the late 20th century the creek had become polluted from steel mill waste. The decline of industry in the region, as well as federal, state, and local efforts, have led to an improvement in water quality. The stream is stocked annually with trout and it has become a popular destination for recreational fly fishing.

Tributaries

Killinger Creek
Bachman Run
Beck Creek
Snitz Creek
Brandywine Creek
Spang Creek

See also
List of rivers of Pennsylvania

References

External links
Quittapahilla Watershed Organization
Quittapahilla Watershed Grant
Fly fishing on the Quittie
Lebanon Valley College - Dedication announcement of the Cuewe-Pehelle statue on the LVC campus.

Rivers of Pennsylvania
Tributaries of Swatara Creek
Rivers of Lebanon County, Pennsylvania